Centre–Piedmont–Cherokee County Regional Airport  is a public-use airport in Cherokee County, Alabama, United States. It is owned by the CPCCR Airport Authority and was dedicated on October 14, 2010.

This airport is included in the FAA's National Plan of Integrated Airport Systems for 2011–2015 which categorized it as a general aviation facility.

This airport is assigned a three-letter location identifier of PYP by the Federal Aviation Administration, but it does not have an International Air Transport Association (IATA) airport code.

Facilities 

See also 
 Centre Municipal Airport
 List of airports in Alabama

References

External links 
 

Airports in Alabama
Transportation buildings and structures in Cherokee County, Alabama